M. Juliana “Julie” McElrath (born January 9, 1951) is a senior vice president and director of the vaccine and infectious disease division at Fred Hutchinson Cancer Research Center and the principal investigator of the HIV Vaccine Trials Network Laboratory Center in Seattle, Washington. She is also a professor at the University of Washington.

McElrath has built and maintains an international HIV vaccine laboratory and has contributed to the fundamental understanding of how HIV-1 – the most common and pathogenic strain of the virus – enters the mucosa to infect people.  Her work centers on developing an HIV vaccine and investigating the complex relationship between HIV and the immune system and is supported in part by the National Institutes of Health and the Bill & Melinda Gates Foundation.

Education and career
McElrath obtained a B.S. in biology from Furman University, a Ph.D. in pathology and an M.D. from the Medical University of South Carolina.  After completing her residency in internal medicine, she received her clinical fellowship training in infectious diseases at Columbia Presbyterian Medical Center in New York and her post-doctoral training in molecular immunology at the Rockefeller University in New York.

During the early 1980s, while working as a medical resident in Charleston, South Carolina, McElrath became inspired to research HIV/AIDS after caring for many young patients who were dying from a mysterious illness that, ultimately, was identified as acquired immune deficiency syndrome, or AIDS. This desire even became more urgent as she focused on infectious diseases in New York City.

In 1988, she was named an assistant professor at the Rockefeller University. In 1990, McElrath relocated to Seattle to take a position at the University of Washington as an assistant professor and to direct the HIV AIDS Madison Clinic at Harborview Medical Center. Within two years, she shifted her focus back to the bench to pursue the path to an HIV vaccine and became the director of the AIDS Vaccine Evaluation Unit at the University of Washington.

In 2000, while driving through villages in the coastal areas near Durban, South Africa, she saw the tangible toll of the AIDS epidemic. Elderly women were cradling crying babies and teenagers were tending to toddlers – the orphaned survivors of a decimated generation, she recalled in an interview. At the same time, a large percentage of people in the region also were known to be infected with HIV. She later described the situation as "terribly sobering."

In 1996, McElrath joined the faculty at Fred Hutchinson Cancer Research Center, bringing her work toward an HIV vaccine to the center.  She was honored for her research with an NIH Merit Award and served as associate editor of the Journal of Infectious Diseases. Over time, she became a full professor at the University of Washington  a full member at Fred Hutch, and the director of the HIV Vaccine Trials Network (HTVN) Laboratory Center. Headquartered at Fred Hutch, HVTN is the world's largest network dedicated to testing vaccines designed to prevent HIV.

The finding launched a push to better understand how the trial vaccines prevented HIV and how they could be improved. That initiative became a major focus of the HVTN's lab program, headed by McElrath. The Thai trial led McElrath, her colleagues and collaborators at Duke University and the Henry M. Jackson Foundation for the Advancement of Military Medicine to make a pivotal discovery. For the first time, they pinpointed "immune correlates" that were associated with reduced HIV risk. One of their key findings suggested the vaccines might spur some recipients to make antibodies that prevent HIV infection. McElrath’s quest to develop an HIV vaccine spurred her effort to launch a new immunology lab Cape Town, South Africa. That facility opened its doors in 2013.

In addition to her work with HVTN and at Fred Hutch, McElrath is an attending physician at Harborview Medical Center, the University of Washington Medical Center, and Seattle Cancer Care Alliance, the treatment arm of Fred Hutch. She has published nearly 300 papers in peer-reviewed journals, the majority on HIV/AIDS. In 2007, she co-founded the Vaccine Infectious Disease Institute at Fred Hutch and has served as the sole director of the Vaccine and Infectious Disease Division at Fred Hutch since 2011.

Research
McElrath’s scientific interests include investigations to understand the human immune responses that control and prevent HIV-1 infection by using multi-disciplinary and cross-platform approaches.  She continues to be involved in a global initiative to develop an HIV-1 vaccine, and in research to identify innate and mucosal immune defenses generated following vaccination. McElrath has taken a leadership role or has been a significant contributor to numerous integrated programs at the national and international level to advance a coordinated effort to curb the HIV epidemic through prevention efforts. Those include: the HIV Vaccine Trials Network, the Gates Foundation Innate Immunity Consortium (PI), the Microbicide Trials Network (Director, Immunology Core), and the Seattle Vaccine Trials Unit (PI).

At the McElrath Laboratory at Fred Hutch, a primary goal is to determine how T cell memory is induced both in natural infection and by immunization. McElrath and her team also are working to identify the properties of T cells that confer containment or eradication of HIV-1. Their studies span a wide array of immunologic investigations in persons who experience unusual control of HIV-1 infection, including individuals with newly diagnosed infection, those with long-term non-progressive disease who control infection for more than a decade without antiretroviral treatment, and people repeatedly exposed but not infected. These clinical cohorts have been assembled for longitudinal studies in both Seattle and in two nations where the HIV epidemic is widespread – South Africa and Uganda.

On Dec. 1, 2015, the work of McElrath and HTVN scientists pursuing a vaccine to potentially halt HIV and AIDS will be highlighted in an HBO/VICE special report titled "Countdown to Zero."

Honors
McElrath is a member of the Association of American Physicians, American College of Physicians and the Infectious Diseases Society of America. She is a past recipient of the Burroughs Wellcome Clinical Scientist Award in Translational Research, a National Institutes of Health Merit Award, and the GAIA Vaccine Foundation Award.  She serves on numerous scientific advisory committees and boards for institutions, government and industry.

Selected works

References

American pathologists
1951 births
Living people
University of Washington faculty
American women scientists
American women academics
21st-century American women